The Soueast V5 Lingzhi (菱致) is a compact sedan produced by Chinese manufacturer Soueast Motors since 2012 to replace the Soueast V3 Lingzhi.

Overview 
The V5 Lingzhi was previewed by the V5 concept during the 2008 Beijing Auto Show, with the production version debuting during the 2012 Beijing Auto Show and listed in September 2012.

Technical specifications
The Soueast V5 is based on the same platform as the previous generation Mitsubishi Lancer that is still being made by the SouEast-Mitsubishi joint venture in China. Prices for the V5 Lingzhi ranges from around 70,000 to 90,000 yuan. The V5 was only available with an imported Mitsubishi-sourced ’4B10′ 1.8 liter engine with 144hp mated to a CVT at launch, with SouEast offering its own 1.5 liter engine and 1.5 liter turbo engine in following updates. According to the official website, an electric version named the Soueast V5 EV was also available as of 2018.

Soueast V5 Lingzhi Plus
A facelift was conducted in 2015 dubbed the Lingzhi Plus, changing the front and rear end designs. The Soueast V5 plus was offered in 7 variants, with 2 engine options carried over from the pre-facelift model, a 1.5 liter engine and a 1.5 liter Turbo engine. Same as the engines, there are 2 gearboxes also carried over from the pre-facelift model, including both the manual transmission and the continuously variable transmission. Maximum engine power is 110.0kW, and maximum horsepower is 150 PS, with the maximum torque being 200.0N ·M. Vehicle length, width and height is 4578×1775×1480mm. The price range of the V5 Lingzhi Plus is 76,900-10,5900 yuan.

Soueast V6 Lingshi 

The Soueast V6 Ling Shi is the compact hatchback version of the SouEast V5 Lingzhi compact sedan. It was previewed by the Soueast V6 concept on the 2012 Beijing Auto Show in April 2012. The early production version debuted on the 2012 Guangzhou Auto Show in December 2012 and the official launch was during the 2013 Shanghai Auto Show. 

The V6 is based on the same platform of the SouEast V5 Lingzhi sedan which is also shared with the Mitsubishi Lancer that is made by the SouEast-Mitsubishi joint venture. Only engine available for the V6 is a 1.5 liter with 120hp and 143nm, mated to a 5-speed manual transmission or a CVT gearbox.

The Soueast V6 Lingshi hatchback was officially launched on the 2013 Shanghai Auto Show and introduced to the Chinese car market at the same time with prices starting from 74,800 yuan to 95,800 yuan.

Soueast V6 Lingshi Turbo
The SouEast V6 Lingshi Turbo is a sportier variant of the V6 hatchback equipped with a turbocharged 1.5 liter four-cylinder petrol engine with an output of 141hp and 210nm, mated to a 6-speed manual transmission or a CVT gearbox. The sportier Soueast V6 Lingshi Turbo was launched on the Chinese auto market in late 2013 with prices starting from 86,800 yuan to 114,800 yuan.

Soueast V Cross 

A crossover version based on the Soueast V6 Lingshi hatchback dubbed the Soueast V6 Ling Shi Cross or later simply the Soueast V Cross debuted during the 2014 Beijing Auto Show. Engines are a 1.5 liter engine with 120hp and 143nm, or a 1.5 liter turbo engine with 141hp and 210nm. The 1.5 liter engine comes with a 5-speed manual transmission or a CVT gearbox, while the 1.5 liter turbo engine is mated with a 6-speed manual transmission or a CVT gearbox.

See also 
 Mitsubishi Lancer

References

External links 

 Soueast V5 website
 Soueast V Cross website
 Soueast EV website

V5
Cars introduced in 2012
Compact cars
Front-wheel-drive vehicles
Hatchbacks
Sedans
Vehicles with CVT transmission
2010s cars
Cars of China